Timothy Bass Woodward Jr. (born October 15, 1983), is an American actor and film director known for his leading roles in multiple films and as Scott in the television series currently on Hulu, Hollywood East. Woodward started his career in 2005 on the PAX TV series Palmetto Pointe playing the lead character Tristan Sutton. He also directed the films The Good, the Bad, and the Dead (2015), Traded (2016), American Violence (2017), Hickok (2017), The Final Wish (2018), The Outsider (2019), and The Call (2020).

References

External links 
Timothy Woodward Jr. at Internet Movie Database 
Timothy Woodward Jr. at TV Guide

1983 births
Living people
American male television actors
21st-century American male actors
Male actors from South Carolina
American male film actors
People from Georgetown, South Carolina
American film directors